Scythris tsherkesella is a moth of the family Scythrididae. It was described by Mark I. Falkovitsh in 1969. It is found in Uzbekistan, Kazakhstan, Turkmenistan and Mongolia.

References

tsherkesella
Moths described in 1969
Moths of Asia